Clara railway station serves the town of Clara in County Offaly.

The station lies on the Dublin to Galway and Dublin to Westport or Ballina line.

History
The station opened on 3 October 1859.

Clara was once a railway junction, with a branch to Streamstown on the now disused Athlone–Mullingar link.

Accidents and incidents
On 9 March 2019, a woman was seriously injured after being hit by a train to Westport near the station. Services were suspended for a few hours as a result.

See also
 List of railway stations in Ireland

References

External links
Irish Rail Clara Station Website

Iarnród Éireann stations in County Offaly
Railway stations in County Offaly
Railway stations opened in 1859
1859 establishments in Ireland
Railway stations in the Republic of Ireland opened in the 19th century